Nitish Rana (born 27 December 1993) is an Indian cricketer who plays for Delhi in domestic cricket and for Kolkata Knight Riders & Mumbai Indians in the Indian Premier League (IPL). He is a left-handed batsman and a part-time off spinner bowler. In November 2018, he was named as the captain of Delhi, replacing Gautam Gambhir. He made his international debut for the India in July 2021.

Playing style
He was the leading six-hitter of the 2015–16 Syed Mushtaq Ali Trophy

Rana made his first-class debut in the 2015–16 Ranji Trophy and ended the tournament with 557 runs, averaging 50.63 and finishing as his team's leading run-getter. He was his team's second highest run-scorer in the 2015–16 Vijay Hazare Trophy with 218 runs.

In the 2015–16 Syed Mushtaq Ali Trophy, Rana struck 299 runs in 8 innings at a strike rate of 175.88 and an average of 42.71. In a match against Andhra in that tournament, Rana came in to bat with Delhi struggling at 40 for 4, and launched a counterattacking innings of 97 off 40 balls (8 fours, 8 sixes) to take his team to 236 for 9 in 20 overs. After Delhi lost three of their top four batsmen for single digit scores against Baroda, Rana top-scored once again with 53 off just 29 balls and helped his team chase down Baroda's total of 153. Against Jharkhand, he hit an unbeaten 60 off 44 balls after Delhi were reduced to 14 for 3 in their chase of 135 and helped his team to a 5-wicket win. In January 2018, he was bought by the Kolkata Knight Riders in the 2018 IPL auction.

In October 2018, Rana was named in India A's squad for the 2018–19 Deodhar Trophy. In December 2018, he was named in India's team for the 2018 ACC Emerging Teams Asia Cup. In October 2019, he was named in India B's squad for the 2019–20 Deodhar Trophy.

Banning and investigation of age-fudging
Rana was one of the 22 players banned by Board of Control for Cricket in India (BCCI) for the age-fudging reason in 2015.

In IPL 2020, Rana was investigated for his involvement in age-fudging again but the allegations were proved wrong.

International career
In June 2021, Rana was named in India's One Day International (ODI) and Twenty20 International (T20I) squads for their series against Sri Lanka. He made his ODI debut on 23 July 2021, for India against Sri Lanka. He scored 7 runs off 14 balls on his debut. He made his T20I debut on 28 July 2021, for India against Sri Lanka.

Personal life 
In 18 February, 2019, Nitish married with his long-term girlfriend Saachi Marwah, who is a cousin-sister of Indian-comedian Krushna Abhishek.

References

External links
 

Living people
1993 births
Indian cricketers
India One Day International cricketers
India Twenty20 International cricketers
Delhi cricketers
Mumbai Indians cricketers
India Red cricketers
Kolkata Knight Riders cricketers